An incomplete list of events in 1215 in Italy:

Events
 Fourth Council of the Lateran
 Manfred III of Saluzzo begins reign as Margrave of Saluzzo

Deaths
 Jacopino della Scala
 Manfred II, Marquess of Saluzzo
 Sicard of Cremona
 Jacopino della Scala

Births
 Pope Celestine V

Italy
Italy
Years of the 13th century in Italy